is a Japanese-Taiwanese actress. Her mother is Japanese and her father is Taiwanese. She graduated from Showa University with a degree in Dentistry. Yō Hitoto is her younger sister.

External links
Official site
Tae's Diary (Japanese)

References

Japanese stage actresses
Japanese people of Taiwanese descent
1970 births
Living people
Actresses from Taipei